In Christianity, contrition or contriteness (i.e. crushed by guilt) is repentance for sins one has committed. The remorseful person is said to be contrite.

A central concept in much of Christianity, contrition is regarded as the first step, through Christ, towards reconciliation with God. It consists of repentance for all one's sins, a desire for God over sin, and faith in Christ's redemption on the cross and its sufficiency for salvation (see regeneration and ordo salutis). It is widely referred to throughout the Bible, e.g. Ezekiel 33:11, Psalms 6:7ff, Psalm 51:1–12, Luke 13:5, Luke 18:9–13, and the well-known parable of the prodigal son (Luke 15:11–32).

In the Catholic Church

Nature 
The Council of Trent defined contrition as "sorrow of soul, and a hatred of sin committed, with a firm purpose of not sinning in the future". It is also known as animi cruciatus (affliction of spirit) and compunctio cordis (repentance of heart).

The word "contrition" implies a breaking of something that has become hardened. St. Thomas Aquinas in his Commentary on the Master of the Sentences thus explains its peculiar use: "Since it is requisite for the remission of sin that a man cast away entirely the liking for sin which implies a sort of continuity and solidity in his mind, the act which obtains forgiveness is termed by a figure of speech 'contrition'." This sorrow of soul is not merely speculative sorrow for wrong done, remorse of conscience, or a resolve to amend; it is a real pain and bitterness of soul together with a hatred and horror for sin committed; and this hatred for sin leads to the resolve to sin no more. The early Christian writers in speaking of the nature of contrition sometimes insist on the feeling of sorrow, sometimes on the detestation of the wrong committed. Augustine includes both when writing: "Compunctus corde non solet dici nisi stimulus peccatorum in dolore pœnitendi".

Nearly all the medieval theologians hold that contrition is based principally on the detestation of sin. This detestation presupposes a knowledge of the heinousness of sin, and this knowledge begets sorrow and pain of soul. "A sin is committed by the consent, so it is blotted out by the dissent of the rational will; hence contrition is essentially sorrow. But sorrow has a twofold signification—dissent of the will and the consequent feeling; the former is of the essence of contrition, the latter is its effect."

Necessity 
The formal doctrine of the Church, announced through the Council of Trent, declares that contrition has always been necessary to obtain pardon of one's sins. Contrition is the first and indispensable condition for pardon. While it is possible for one to receive pardon where confession is impossible, there is no case where sin can be pardoned without contrition.

According to the Catholic Encyclopedia, Catholic writers have always insisted that such necessity arises (a) from the very nature of repentance as well as (b) from the positive command of God. From the very nature of repentance, they point out that the sentence of Christ in Luke 13:5, is final: "Except you repent", etc., and from the Fathers they cite passages such as the following from Cyprian, De Lapsis, no. 32: "Do penance in full, give proof of the sorrow that comes from a grieving and lamenting soul. ... They who do away with repentance for sin, close the door to satisfaction." Scholastic doctors laid down the satisfaction principle, "No one can begin a new life who does not repent him of the old" (Bonaventure, In Lib. Sent. IV, dist. xvi, Pt. II, art. 1, Q. ii, also ex professo, ibid., Pt. I, art. I, Q. iii), and when asked the reason why, they point out the absolute incongruity of turning to God and clinging to sin, which is hostile to God's law. The Council of Trent, mindful of the tradition of the ages, defined (Sess. XlV. ch. iv de Contritione) that "contrition has always been necessary for obtaining forgiveness of sin". The positive command of God is also clear in the premises. The Baptist sounded the note of preparation for the coming of the Messiah: "Make straight his paths"; and, as a consequence "they went out to him and were baptized confessing their sins". The first preaching of Jesus is described in the words: "Do penance, for the kingdom of heaven is at hand"; and the Apostles, in their first sermons to the people, warn them to "do penance and be baptized for the remission of their sins" (Acts 2:38). The Fathers followed up with like exhortation (Clement in P.G., I, 341; Hermas iii P.G., II, 894; Tertullian in P.L., II).

Perfect and imperfect contrition
If detestation of sin arises from the love of God, who has been grievously offended, then contrition is termed "perfect"; if it arise from any other motive, such as loss of heaven, fear of hell, or the heinousness of guilt, then it is termed "imperfect contrition", or attrition.

Perfect contrition 
Perfect contrition (also called contrition of charity) is a repentance for sin that is motivated by faith and the love of God. It contrasts with imperfect contrition, which arises from a less pure motive, such as common decency or fear of Hell. The two types of contrition are distinguished by a person's motive for repentance, rather than the intensity of ones feelings or emotions. It is possible for perfect and imperfect contrition to be experienced simultaneously.

In perfect contrition its motive is founded on God's own goodness and not merely his goodness to the sinner or to humanity. There is no way of knowing with an absolute certainty if one has made an act of perfect contrition, but all that is required is the standard of all human action, moral certainty. If one says an act of contrition truthfully, intending it, then one would likely have moral certainty.

Perfect contrition removes the guilt and eternal punishment due to mortal sin, even before the sinner has received absolution in the sacrament of penance (also Sacrament of Reconciliation. Inaccurately, but strongly related: 'Confession'), provided that the person has a firm resolution to have recourse to sacramental confession as soon as possible. An example of this theological precept is demonstrated in the Code of Canon Law in canon 916, which states: "A person who is conscious of grave sin is not to celebrate Mass or receive the body of the Lord without previous sacramental confession unless there is a grave reason and there is no opportunity to confess; in this case the person is to remember the obligation to make an act of perfect contrition which includes the resolution of confessing as soon as possible."

In the case of imminent death, in which sacramental confession may not be possible, an act of perfect contrition removes the guilt and eternal punishment due to mortal sin.

Imperfect contrition 

According to Psalm 111: 10, "The fear of the Lord is the beginning of wisdom." In Philippians 2:12, Paul exhorts Christians to work out "our salvation in fear and trembling". In contrast to perfect contrition, imperfect contrition (also known as attrition) is a desire not to sin for a reason other than love of God. While attrition does not produce justification, attrition does dispose the soul to receive grace in the Catholic Sacrament of Reconciliation.

The Council of Trent (1545–1563) held that while imperfect contrition is motivated by reasons such as "the consideration of the turpitude of sin or from the fear of Hell and punishment", it also is a gift from God. "If any man assert that attrition ... is not a true and a profitable sorrow; that it does not prepare the soul for grace, but that it makes a man a hypocrite, yea, even a greater sinner, let him be Anathema."

The question has also been asked apropos of attrition when one receives a sacrament in mortal sin, of which sin he is not then aware, will attrition with the sacrament suffice unto justification? The answer is generally given in the affirmative.

Scriptural support for attrition can be found in Proverbs 13:13, Proverbs 14:26–27, Proverbs 19:23, Matthew 10:28, and Philippians 2:12.

Criticism of imperfect contrition 
In his 1537 Apology of the Augsburg Confession, Philipp Melanchthon argued against the concept of imperfect contrition on the basis that it leaves the penitent person uncertain:

In his 1537 Smalcald Articles, Martin Luther attacked the Catholic doctrine of imperfect contrition, arguing that "such contrition was certainly mere hypocrisy, and did not mortify the lust for sins; for they had to grieve, while they would rather have continued to sin, if it had been free to them." Instead he argued that "repentance is not piecemeal," and "In like manner confession, too, cannot be false, uncertain, or piecemeal."

Qualities 
In accord with Catholic tradition, contrition, whether perfect or imperfect, must be interior, supernatural, universal, and sovereign.

Interior 
Contrition must be real and sincere sorrow of heart.

Supernatural 
In accordance with Catholic teaching contrition ought to be prompted by God's grace and aroused by motives which spring from faith, as opposed to merely natural motives, such as loss of honour, fortune, and the like (Chemnitz, Exam. Concil. Trid., Pt. II, De Poenit.). In the Old Testament it is God who gives a "new heart" and who puts a "new spirit" into the children of Israel (Ezech. 36:25–29); and for a clean heart the Psalmist prays in the Miserere (Ps. 51, 11 sqq.). Peter told those to whom he preached in the first days after Pentecost that God the Father had raised up Christ "to give repentance to Israel" (Acts, v, 30 sq.). Paul, in advising Timothy, insists on dealing gently and kindly with those who resist the truth, "if peradventure God may give them full repentance" (2 Timothy, 2:24–25). In the days of the Pelagian heresy Augustine insisted on the supernaturalness of contrition, when he writes, "That we turn away from God is our doing, and this is the bad will; but to turn back to God we are unable unless He arouse and help us, and this is the good will." Some of the Scholastic doctors, notably Scotus, Cajetan, and after them Suarez (De Poenit., Disp. iii, sect. vi), asked speculatively whether man if left to himself could elicit a true act of contrition, but no theologian ever taught that what makes for forgiveness of sin in the present economy of God could be inspired by merely natural motives. On the contrary, all the doctors have insisted on the absolute necessity of grace for contrition that disposes to forgiveness (Bonaventure, In Lib. Sent. IV, dist. xiv, Part I, art. II, Q. iii; also dist. xvii, Part I, art. I, Q. iii; cf.  Thomas, In Lib. Sent. IV). In keeping with this teaching of the Scriptures and the doctors, the Council of Trent defined; "If anyone say that without the inspiration of the Holy Spirit and without His aid a man can repent in the way that is necessary for obtaining the grace of justification, let him be anathema."

Universal 
True contrition must extend to, at the very least, all mortal sins committed, and not just a select convenient few. This doctrine is intimately bound up with the Catholic teaching concerning grace and repentance. There is no forgiveness without sorrow of soul, and forgiveness is always accompanied by God's grace; grace cannot coexist with sin; and, as a consequence, one sin cannot be forgiven while another remains for which there is no repentance.

The prophet Joel urged men to turn to God with their whole heart (Joel 2:12–19). and Christ tells the doctor of the law that we must love God with our whole mind, our whole strength (Luke 10:27). Ezekiel insists that a man must "turn from his evil ways" if he wish to live (Ezekiel 33:11).

The Scholastics inquired into this question when they asked whether or not there must be a special act of contrition for every serious sin, and whether, in order to be forgiven, one must remember at the moment all grievous transgressions. To both questions they answered in the negative, judging that an act of sorrow which implicitly included all one's sins would be sufficient.

Sovereign 
According to Mark 8:35–37, Jesus admonished his disciples: "For those who want to save their life will lose it, and those who lose their life for my sake, and for the sake of the gospel, will save it. For what will it profit them to gain the whole world and forfeit their life? Indeed, what can they give in return for their life?" Contrition for sin must take precedence over temporal concerns. When the envoys of the Empress Eudoxia threatened John Chrysostom, he responded, "Go tell the princess that Chrysostom fears only one thing, and that is sin."

Sacrament of Penance 

Contrition is not only a moral virtue, but the Council of Trent defined that it is a "part", and even more, quasi materia, in the Sacrament of Penance. "The (quasi) matter of this sacrament consists of the acts of the penitent himself, namely, contrition, confession, and satisfaction. These, inasmuch as they are by God's institution required in the penitent for the integrity of the sacrament and for the full and perfect remission of sin, are for this reason called parts of penance." In consequence of this decree of Trent theologians teach that sorrow for sin must be in some sense sacramental. La Croix went so far as to say that sorrow must be aroused with a view of going to confession, but this seems to be asking too much; most theologians think with Schieler-Heuser (Theory and Practice of Confession, p. 113) that it is sufficient if the sorrow coexist in any way with the confession and is referred to it. Hence the precept of the Roman Ritual, "After the confessor has heard the confession he should try by earnest exhortation to move the penitent to contrition" (Schieler-Heuser, op. cit., p. 111 sqq.). For repentance is essential for the effectiveness of this sacrament, as the Catechism of the Catholic Church explains:
 Jesus' call to conversion and penance ... does not aim first at outward works ... but at the conversion of the heart, interior conversion (1430). Interior repentance is a radical reorientation of our whole life, a return, a conversion to God with all our heart, an end of sin, a turning away from evil, ... the desire and resolution to change one's life, with hope in God's mercy and trust in the help of his grace (1431).

For Catholics, where there is mortal sin, use of the Sacrament of Reconciliation must follow.

Perfect contrition without the Sacrament of Penance 

Regarding that contrition which has for its motive the love of God, the Council of Trent declares: "The Council further teaches that, though contrition may sometimes be made perfect by charity and may reconcile men to God before the actual reception of this sacrament, still the reconciliation is not to be ascribed to the contrition apart from the desire for the sacrament which it includes." The following proposition (no. 32) taken from Baius was condemned by Gregory XIII: "That charity which is the fullness of the law is not always conjoined with forgiveness of sins." Perfect contrition, with the desire of receiving the Sacrament of Penance, restores the sinner to grace at once. This is certainly the teaching of the Scholastic doctors (Peter Lombard in P.L., CXCII, 885; St. Thomas, In Lib. Sent. IV, ibid.; St. Bonaventure, In Lib. Sent. IV, ibid.). This doctrine they derived from Holy Writ. Scripture certainly ascribes to charity and the love of God the power to take away sin: "He that loveth me shall be loved by My Father"; "Many sins are forgiven her because she hath loved much" (Luke 7:36-50).

Since the act of perfect contrition implies necessarily this same love of God, theologians have ascribed to perfect contrition what Scripture teaches belongs to charity. Nor is this strange, for in the Old Covenant there was some way of recovering God's grace once man had sinned. God wills not the death of the wicked, but that the wicked turn from his way and live (Ezech. 33:11). This total turning to God corresponds to our idea of perfect contrition; and if under the Old Law love sufficed for the pardon of the sinner, surely the coming of Christ and the institution of the Sacrament of Penance cannot be supposed to have increased the difficulty of obtaining forgiveness. That the earlier Fathers taught the efficacy of sorrow for the remission of sins is very clear (Clement in P.G., I, 341 sqq.; and Hermas in P.G., II, 894 sqq.; Chrysostom in P.G., XLIX, 285 sqq.) and this is particularly noticeable in all the commentaries on Luke, vii, 47.

The Venerable Bede writes (P.L., XCII, 425): "What is love but fire; what is sin but rust? Hence it is said, many sins are forgiven her because she hath loved much, as though to say, she hath burned away entirely the rust of sin, because she is inflamed with the fire of love." Theologians have inquired with much learning as to the kind of love that justifies with the Sacrament of Penance. All are agreed that pure, or disinterested, love (amor benevolentiæ, amor amicitiæ) suffices; when there is question of interested, or selfish, love (amor concupiscentia) theologians hold that purely selfish love is not sufficient. When one furthermore asks what must be the formal motive in perfect love, there seems to be no real unanimity among the doctors. Some say that where there is perfect love God is loved for His great goodness alone; others, basing their contention on Scripture, think that the love of gratitude (amor gratitudinis) is quite sufficient, because God's benevolence and love towards men are intimately united, even inseparable from His Divine perfections (Hurter, Theol. Dog., Thesis ccxlv, Scholion iii, no 3; Schieler-Heuser, op. cit., pp. 77 sq.).

Obligation of eliciting the act of contrition 
In the very nature of things the sinner must repent before being reconciled with God (Sess. XIV, ch. iv, de Contritione, Fuit quovis tempore, etc.). Therefore, whoever falls into grievous sin must either make an act of perfect contrition or supplement the imperfect contrition by receiving the Sacrament of Penance; otherwise reconciliation with God is impossible. This obligation urges under pain of sin when there is danger of death. In danger of death, therefore, if a priest be not at hand to administer the sacrament, the sinner must make an effort to elicit an act of perfect contrition. The obligation of perfect contrition is also urgent whensoever one has to exercise some act for which a state of grace is necessary and the Sacrament of Penance is not accessible. Theologians have questions how long a person may remain in the state of sin, without making an effort to elicit an act of perfect contrition. They seem agreed that such neglect must have extended over considerable time, but what constitutes a considerable time they find it hard to determine (Schieler-Hauser, op. cit., pp. 83 sqq.). Probably the rule of St. Alphonsus Liguori will aid the solution: "The duty of making an act of contrition is urgent when one is obliged to make an act of love" (Sabetti, Theologia Moralis: de necess. contritionis, no. 731; Ballerine, Opus Morale: de contritione).

In other Christian theology 

The Augsburg Confession, the primary confession of faith of the Lutheran Church, divides repentance into two parts: "One is contrition, that is, terrors smiting the conscience through the knowledge of sin; the other is faith, which is born of the Gospel, or of absolution, and believes that for Christ's sake, sins are forgiven, comforts the conscience, and delivers it from terrors."

Puritan preacher Thomas Hooker defined contrition as "nothing else, namely, when a sinner by the sight of sin and vileness of it, and the punishment due to the same, is made sensible of sin, and is made to hate it, and hath his heart separated from the same."

Anglo-Catholic rector of St. Mark's Church in Philadelphia, Alfred Garnett Mortimer, pointed out that "feelings" are not an adequate gauge of contrition. The signs of true contrition are a readiness to confess, a readiness to amend one's life and avoid temptation, and a readiness to forgive others.

See also 
 Act of Contrition
 Atonement (governmental view)
 Forgiveness
 Mercy
 Pardon
 Ordo salutis
 Regeneration (theology)
 Sacrament of Penance

Footnotes

References 

Sylvester Joseph Hunter, Outlines of Dogmatic Theology (New York, 1896)
Suarez, De Pænitentia, disp. iv, sect. iii, a,2
Bellarmine, De Controversiis, Book II, De sacramento pænitentiæ
Denifle, Luther und Luthertum in der ersten Entwicklung (Mainz, 1906), I, 229 sqq., II, 454, 517, 618 sq.
Collet in Migne, Theologiæ Cursus Completus (Paris, 1840), XXII
Palmieri, De Pænitentia (Rome, 1879; Prato, 1896)
Petavius, Dogmata Theologica: de pænitentia (Paris, 1867).

External links 

 Etymology online

Atonement in Christianity
Emotions
Catholic penitential practices
Christian hamartiology
Christian terminology
Catholic theology and doctrine

fr:Repentir (christianisme)